= Ghanem Bashir =

Emirati footballer (born 1986)

Personal information
- Full name: Ghanem Ahmed Bashir
- Date of birth: 11 November 1986 (age 39)
- Place of birth: United Arab Emirates
- Height: 1.75 m (5 ft 9 in)
- Position: Defender

Senior career*
Years	Team	Apps	(Gls)
2007–2011	Baniyas		
2011–2012	Al-Sharjah		
2012–2013	Al-Ahli		
2013–2015	Al-Wasl		
2015–2017	Ittihad Kalba		
- * Club domestic league appearances and goals

Ghanem Bashir (Arabic: غانم بشير) (born 11 November 1986) is an Emirati footballer. He currently plays as a defender.
